Divinity is a role-playing video game series developed by Larian Studios. The franchise was introduced in 2002 with Divine Divinity. The franchise received more mainstream attention following the critically and commercially successful release of Divinity: Original Sin (2014).

Main games

Divine Divinity (2002)

Development of Divine Divinity started as Divinity: The Sword of Lies. The game was based on developer Larian Studios's cancelled project, The Lady, the Mage and the Knight, and it was inspired by Diablo. According to studio founder Swen Vincke, the publisher rushed Divine Divinitys development and released the game "unexpectedly". At that time, Vincke was still on press tours promoting it and did not know that the game, which required more work, was released. The game received generally positive reviews upon release and it sold very well. However, the contract agreement with the publisher meant that Larian did not earn any money from the game as the game was not commercially successful enough. Larian nearly closed its doors following the release of the game.

Beyond Divinity (2004)

Vincke reassembled the development team to make a sequel to Divine Divinity, and the main goal for this release was to "make money". The development for the game was also rushed, with quests being rewritten and features being removed so that the game could release on time. The game received generally mixed reviews upon release, and it is considered to be one of the weaker games in the series.

Divinity II (2009)

While the first two installments in the series were isometric role-playing games, the team wanted to step up and make a 3D action role-playing game. The team was impressed by the production value behind Xbox 360 games and therefore, decide to make an "ambitious" game for that platform. Bethesda Game Studios agreed to license their Gamebryo engine for Larian to make the game. Divinity II: Ego Draconis was released in 2009, and the publishers rushed the game's development again as they were under the pressure of bankruptcy during the 2009 financial crisis. The game received mixed reviews upon release. An updated version for the game, titled The Dragon Knight Saga, was released in 2010 and published by Focus Home Interactive. The Dragon Knight Saga received generally positive reviews, a significant improvement over Ego Draconis. It also sold fairly well.

Divinity: Original Sin (2014)

Using the funds from venture capitalists, the team wanted to create a turn-based strategy game for Xbox Live Arcade. The team saw the opportunity of making a 3D isometric role-playing game since there were not a lot of these games on the market. However, despite the team wanting to expand the game's scope, many of its staff were reassigned to finish Dragon Commander, which was not very profitable for the company. As the studio was working on the game, they wanted to expand its scope, but the studio was slowly running out of money. According to a studio member, Original Sin was the "do or die" project for Larian. A crowdfunding campaign was launched on Kickstarter on 27 March 2013 so that the team would have additional budget to polish the game. The Kickstarter was successfully funded by 26 April, raising almost $950,000, with donations from other sources bringing the total to over $1,000,000 of the game's final budget of €4 million. The game was made by about 35-40 people. The game received very positive reviews when it was released in 2014, and an Enhanced Edition for the game was published by Focus Home in the following year for consoles.

Divinity: Original Sin II (2017)

Following the success of Original Sin, the studio decided to expand their team to about 130 in order to make a sequel. Larian returned to Kickstarter to secure additional funds for the game's development. Despite being financially stable, Larian returned to crowdfunding again so that they can gather community opinion and further expand the scope of the game. Ultimately, the Kickstarter campaign was a big success, with over 2 million dollars collected in total. The game was released as an early access title in 2016, and the full release came in the following year. The game received critical acclaim upon release, and it was regarded as one of the best role-playing games of all time.

Spin-offs

Divinity: Dragon Commander (2013)

Following multiple unpleasant experiences with publishers, the team decided to approach venture capitalists directly to fund the game's development. Dragon Commander is a spin-off title, which expanded the dragon combat featured in Divinity II. It is a real-time strategy game and it received generally mixed reviews from critics. Dragon Commander was not a very profitable game, according to Vincke.

Divinity: Fallen Heroes (on hold)
Larian Studios partnered with Logic Artists to create a tactical role-playing game based on the series. Originally scheduled to be released in November 2019, it was put on hold indefinitely a month before the scheduled release date as Larian stated that the game required significantly more development time and resources.

Other media
Larian partnered with Lynnvander Studios to make Divinity: Original Sin the Board Game.

See also
 Baldur's Gate III

References

Video game franchises introduced in 2002
Video games developed in Belgium
Video game franchises
Role-playing video games by series